Kindergarten is a preschool educational approach based on playing, singing, practical activities such as drawing, and social interaction as part of the transition from home to school. Such institutions were originally made in the late 18th century in Germany, Bavaria and Alsace to serve children whose parents both worked outside home. The term was coined by German pedagogue Friedrich Fröbel, whose approach globally influenced early-years education. Today, the term is used in many countries to describe a variety of educational institutions and learning spaces for children ranging from 2 to 6 years of age, based on a variety of teaching methods.

History

Early years and development
In 1779, Johann Friedrich Oberlin and Louise Scheppler founded in Strasbourg an early establishment for caring for and educating preschool children whose parents were absent during the day. At about the same time, in 1780, similar infant establishments were created in Bavaria. In 1802, Princess Pauline zur Lippe established a preschool center in Detmold, the capital of the then principality of Lippe, Germany (now in the State of North Rhine-Westphalia).

In 1816, Robert Owen, a philosopher and pedagogue, opened the first British and probably globally the first infants school in New Lanark, Scotland. In conjunction with his venture for cooperative mills Owen wanted the children to be given a good moral education so that they would be fit for work. His system was successful in producing obedient children with basic literacy and numeracy.

Samuel Wilderspin opened his first infant school in London in 1819, and went on to establish hundreds more. He published many works on the subject, and his work became the model for infant schools throughout England and further afield. Play was an important part of Wilderspin's system of education. He is credited with inventing the playground. In 1823, Wilderspin published On the Importance of Educating the Infant Poor, based on the school. He began working for the Infant School Society the next year, informing others about his views. He also wrote The Infant System, for developing the physical, intellectual, and moral powers of all children from 1 to seven years of age.
In 1836 she established an institute for the foundation of preschool centers. The idea became popular among the nobility and the middle class and was copied throughout the Kingdom of Hungary.

Creation of the kindergarten
Friedrich Fröbel (1782–1852) opened a "play and activity" institute in 1837, in the village of Bad Blankenburg, in the principality of Schwarzburg-Rudolstadt, Thuringia, as an experimental social experience for children entering school. He renamed his institute  (meaning garden of children) on June 28, 1840, reflecting his belief that children should be nurtured and nourished "like plants in a garden". Fröbel introduced an educational environment into his school, in contrast to other earlier infant establishments, and is therefore credited with the creation of kindergartens. Around 1873, Caroline Wiseneder's method for teaching instrumental music to young children was adopted by the national kindergarten movement in Germany.

Women trained by Fröbel opened kindergartens throughout Europe and around the world. The first kindergarten in the US was founded in Watertown, Wisconsin in 1856, and was conducted in German by Margaretha Meyer-Schurz.

Elizabeth Peabody founded the first English-language kindergarten in the US in 1860. The first free kindergarten in the US was founded in 1870 by Conrad Poppenhusen, a German industrialist and philanthropist, who also established the Poppenhusen Institute. The first publicly financed kindergarten in the US was established in St. Louis in 1873 by Susan Blow.

Canada's first private kindergarten was opened by the Wesleyan Methodist Church in Charlottetown, Prince Edward Island, in 1870. By the end of the decade, they were common in large Canadian towns and cities. In 1882, The country's first public-school kindergartens were established in Berlin, Ontario (modern Kitchener) at the Central School. In 1885, the Toronto Normal School (teacher training) opened a department for kindergarten teaching.

The Australian kindergarten movement emerged in the last decade of the nineteenth century as both a philanthropic and educational endeavour. The first free kindergarten in Australia was established in 1896 in Sydney, New South Wales, by the Kindergarten Union of NSW (now KU Children's Services) led by reformer Maybanke Anderson.

American educator Elizabeth Harrison wrote extensively on the theory of early childhood education and worked to enhance educational standards for kindergarten teachers by establishing what became the National College of Education in 1886.

By country

Afghanistan

In Afghanistan, children between the ages of 3 and 6 attend kindergartens. Although kindergartens in Afghanistan are not part of the school system, they are often run by the government.

Early childhood development programs were first introduced during the Soviet occupation with the establishment in 1980 of 27 urban preschools, or kodakistan. The number of preschools grew steadily during the 1980s, peaking in 1990 with more than 270 in Afghanistan. At its peak, there were 2,300 teachers caring for more than 21,000 children in the country. These facilities were an urban phenomenon, mostly in Kabul, and were attached to schools, government offices, or factories. Based on the Soviet model, these early childhood development programs provided nursery care, preschool, and kindergarten for children from 3 months to 6 years of age under the direction of the Department of Labor and Social Welfare.

The vast majority of Afghan families were never exposed to this system, and many of these families were in opposition to these programs due to the belief that it diminishes the central role of the family and inculcates children with Soviet values. With the onset of civil war after the Soviet withdrawal, the number of kindergartens dropped rapidly. By 1995, only 88 functioning facilities serving 2,110 children survived, and the Taliban restrictions on female employment eliminated all of the remaining centers in areas under their control. In 2007, there were about 260 kindergarten/preschool centers serving over 25,000 children. Though every government center is required to have an early childhood center, at present, no governmental policies deal with early childhood and no institutions have either the responsibility or the capacity to provide such services.

Australia

In each state of Australia, kindergarten (frequently referred to as kinder or kindy) means something slightly different. In Tasmania, New South Wales and the Australian Capital Territory, it is the first year of primary school. In Victoria, kindergarten is a form of preschool and may be referred to interchangeably as preschool or kindergarten. In Victoria and Tasmania, the phrase for the first year of primary school is called Prep (short for "preparatory"), which is followed by Year 1.

In Queensland, kindergarten is usually an institution for children around the age of 4 and thus it is the precursor to preschool and primary education. As with Victoria and Tasmania, the first year of primary school is also called Prep, which is then followed by Year 1.

The year preceding the first year of primary school education in Western Australia, South Australia or the Northern Territory is referred to respectively as pre-primary, reception or transition. In Western Australia, the year preceding pre-primary is called kindergarten.

Bangladesh

In Bangladesh, the term kindergarten, or KG school (kindergarten school), is used to refer to the schooling children attend from 3 to 6 years of age. The names of the levels are nursery,  (children), etc. The view of kindergarten education has changed significantly over time. Almost every rural area now has at least one kindergarten school, with most being run in the Bengali language. They also follow the textbooks published by the National Curriculum and Textbook Board (NCTB) with slight modification, adding some extra books to the syllabus. The grades generally start from nursery (sometimes "play group"), "KG" afterwards, and end with the 5th grade. Separate from the National Education System, kindergarten contributes greatly toward achieving the Millennium Development Goal of universal primary education in Bangladesh.

Brazil 

In Brazil, kindergarten (Portuguese: Jardim de Infância) is the only non-compulsory education modality, for children up to 4 years old completed after March 31 for the vast majority of states. From the age of 4 completed until March 31, the child is eligible for preschool (Pré-Escola), which is mandatory and precedes the 1st grade. When a child turns 6 years old between April 1 and December 31, he/she must be in kindergarten (last grade of preschool nursery school), also known as kindergarten III, also known as “3º período da Escola Infantil”.

Bulgaria

In Bulgaria, the term  refers to the caring and schooling children attend from ages 3 to 7 (in some cases 6). Most Bulgarian kindergartens are public. Since 2012, two years of preschool education are compulsory. These two years of mandatory preschool education may be attended either in kindergarten or in preparatory groups at primary schools.

Canada

Schools outside of Ontario and the Northwest Territories generally provide one year of kindergarten, except some private schools which offer junior kindergarten (JK) for 4-year-olds (school before kindergarten is most commonly referred to as preschool). Kindergarten is mandatory in British Columbia, New Brunswick, and Prince Edward Island, and is optional elsewhere. The province of Nova Scotia refers to Kindergarten as Grade Primary. After kindergarten, the child begins grade one.

The province of Ontario and the Northwest Territories provide two years of kindergarten, usually part of an elementary school. Within the French school system in Ontario, junior kindergarten is called  and senior kindergarten is called , which is a calque of the German word .

Within the province of Quebec, junior kindergarten is called  (which is not mandatory), is attended by 4-year-olds, and senior kindergarten (SK) is called , which is also not mandatory by the age of 5; this class is integrated into primary schools.

Chile

It is the first level of the Chilean educational system. Generally, schools imparting this level, the JUNJI (National Council of Kindergarten Schools) and other private institutions have the following organization of groups or subcategories of levels:
 Low nursery: Babies from 85 days to 1 year old.
 High nursery: Children from 1 to 2 years old.
 Low Middle Level: Children from 2 to 3 years old.
 High Middle Level: Children from 3 to 4 years old.
 First level of transition: Often called pre-kinder, for children from 4 to 5 years old.
 Second level of transition: Usually called kinder, for children from 5 to 6 years old.

China

In China, preschool education, before the child enters formal schooling at 6 years of age, is generally divided into a "nursery" or "preschool" stage and a "kindergarten" stage. These can be two separate institutions, or a single combined one in different areas. Where there are two separate institutions, it is common for the kindergarten to consist of the two upper years, and the preschool to consist of one lower year. Common names for these three years are:
 Nursery (or preschool or playgroup): 3- to 4-year-old children
 Lower kindergarten: 4- to 5-year-old children
 Upper kindergarten: 5- to 6-year-old children.

In some places, children at 5–6 years may in addition or instead attend reception or preparatory classes focusing on preparing children for formal schooling.

State (public) kindergartens only accept children older than 3 years, while private ones do not have such limitations.

Denmark

Kindergarten is a day care service offered to children from age three until the child starts attending school. Kindergarten classes (grade 0) were made mandatory in 2009 and are offered by primary schools before a child enters first grade.

Two-thirds of established day care institutions in Denmark are municipal day care centres while the other third are privately owned and are run by associations of parents or businesses in agreement with local authorities. In terms of both finances and subject matter, municipal and private institutions function according to the same principles.

Denmark is credited with pioneering (although not inventing) forest kindergartens, in which children spend most of every day outside in a natural environment.

Egypt

In Egypt, children may go to kindergarten for two years (KG1 and KG2) between the ages of four and six.

Finland

At the end of the 1850s, Uno Cygnaeus, known as the "father of the Finnish primary school", presented the idea of bringing kindergartens to Finland after attending a kindergarten in Hamburg and a seminar training kindergarten teachers during his study trip to Central Europe. As early as 1920, there were about 80 kindergartens in operation across Finland, with a total of about 6,000 children.

Kindergarten activity emphases and background communities vary. In Finland, most kindergartens are society's service to families while some are private. The underlying philosophy may be Montessori or Waldorf education. Preschools often also operate in connection with Finnish kindergartens. Kindergartens can also arrange language immersion programs in different languages. Finnish kindergartens now have an early childhood education plan, and parenting discussions are held with the parents of each child every year. Among OECD countries, Finland has higher-than-average public funding for early childhood education and the highest number of staff for children under the age of 3: only four children per adult.

France

Free  schools are available throughout the country, welcoming children aged from 3 to 5 (although in many places, children under three may not be granted a place). It became compulsory in 2018 for all children aged 3. Even before the 2018 law, almost all children aged 3 to 5 attended . It is regulated by the Ministry of National Education.

Germany

By contrast,  or  refers to a crèche for the care of children before they enter  (9 weeks to about three years), while —literally "children's day site", usually shortened to —is an umbrella term for any day care facility for preschoolers.

Attendance is voluntary, and usually not free of charge. Preschool children over the age of one are entitled to receive local and affordable day care. Within the federal system,  fall under the responsibility of the states, which usually delegate a large share of the responsibility to the municipalities. Due to the subsidiarity principle stipulated by §4 , there are a multitude of operators, from municipalities, churches and welfare societies to parents' initiatives and profit-based corporations. Many  follow a certain educational approach, such as Montessori, Reggio Emilia, "" or Waldorf; forest kindergartens are well established. Most  are subsidised by the community councils, with the fees depending on the income of the parents.

Even in smaller townships, there are often both Roman Catholic and Lutheran kindergartens available. Places in crèches and kindergarten are often difficult to secure and must be reserved in advance, although the situation has improved with a new law in effect August 2013. The availability of childcare, however, varies greatly by region. It is usually better in eastern regions, and in big cities in the north, such as Berlin or Hamburg, and poorest in parts of Southern Germany.

 can be open from 7 a.m. to 5 p.m. or longer and may also house a crèche for children between the ages of eight weeks and three years, and possibly an afternoon  (often associated with a primary school) for school-age children aged 6 to 10 who spend time after their lessons there. Alongside nurseries, there are day care nurses ( or ) working independently of any preschool institution in individual homes and looking after only three to five children, typically up to the age of three. These nurses are supported and supervised by local authorities.

Both systems are handled differently in each German state.

Greece

In Greece, kindergarten is called . Kindergarten is a form of preschool and may be referred to interchangeably as preschool.

Hong Kong

Pre-primary Services in Hong Kong refers to provision of education and care to young children by kindergartens and child care centres. Kindergartens, registered with the Education Bureau, provide services for children from three to six years old. Child care centres, on the other hand, are registered with the Social Welfare Department and include nurseries, catering for children aged two to three, and creches, looking after infants from birth to two.

At present, most of the kindergartens operate on a half-day basis offering upper and lower kindergarten and nursery classes. Some kindergartens also operate full-day kindergarten classes. Child care centres also provide full-day and half-day services with most centres providing full-day services.

The aim of pre-primary education in Hong Kong is to provide children with a relaxing and pleasurable learning environment to promote a balanced development of different aspects necessary to a child's development such as the physical, intellectual, language, social, emotional and aesthetic aspects.

To help establish the culture of self-evaluation in kindergartens and to provide reference for the public in assessing the quality and standard of pre-primary education, the Education Bureau has developed performance indicators for pre-primary institutions in Hong Kong. Commencing in the 2000/01 school year, quality assurance inspection was launched to further promote the development of quality early childhood education.

Hungary

Children attend kindergarten between ages 3–6/7 (they go to school in the year in which they have their 7th birthday). Attendance in kindergarten is compulsory from the age of 3 years, though exceptions are made for developmental reasons. Though kindergartens may include programs in subjects such as foreign language and music, children spend most of their time playing. In their last year, children begin preparation for elementary school.

Most kindergartens are state-funded. Kindergarten teachers are required to have a diploma.

India

In India, there are only informal directives pertaining to pre-primary education, for which pre-primary schools and sections need no affiliation. Directives state that children who are three years old on 30 September in the given academic year are eligible to attend nursery and kindergarten classes. Typically, children spend 3 to 4 years of their time in pre-primary school after which they are eligible to attend 1st Standard in Primary School which falls under HRD ministry norms. Pre-primary is not mandatory, however, it is preferred. All government schools and affiliated private schools allow children who are 5 years of age to enroll in standard 1 of a primary school. Mid-day meals are provided in most parts of the country and institutes run by the government.

Italy

In Italy, preschool education refers to two different grades:
 Nursery schools, called  for children between 3 and 36 months;
  formerly  and now , for children 3 to 5 years old.

Italian  were officially instituted in a 1971 State Law (L. 1044/1971), and may be run by either private or public institutions. They were originally established to allow mothers a chance to work outside of the home, and were therefore seen as a social service. Today, they mostly serve the purpose of general education and social interaction. In Italy, much effort has been spent on developing a pedagogical approach to children's care: well known is the so-called Reggio Emilia approach, named after the city of Reggio Emilia, in Emilia-Romagna.

 normally occupy small one-story buildings, surrounded by gardens; usually suitable for no more than 60 or 70 children.

Maternal schools were established in 1968 after State Law n. 444 and are a full part of the official Italian education system, though attendance is not compulsory. Like  (nursery schools), maternal schools may be held either by public or private institutions.

Japan

Early childhood education begins at home, and there are numerous books and television shows aimed at helping mothers and fathers of preschool children to educate their children and to parent more effectively. Much of the home training is devoted to teaching manners, social skills, and structured play, although verbal and number skills are also popular themes. Parents are strongly committed to early education and frequently enroll their children in preschools. Kindergartens, predominantly staffed by young female junior college graduates, are supervised by the Ministry of Education but are not part of the official education system. In addition to kindergartens, there exists a well-developed system of government-supervised nursery schools, supervised by the Ministry of Labor. Whereas kindergartens follow educational aims, nursery schools are predominantly concerned with providing care for infants and toddlers. Together, these two kinds of institutions enroll 86% at age 3 and 99% at age 5 prior to their entrance into the formal system at first grade. The Ministry of Education's 1990 Course of Study for Preschools, which applies to both kinds of institutions, covers such areas as human relationships, health, environment, language, and expression. Starting from March 2008 the new revision of curriculum guidelines for kindergartens as well as for preschools came into effect.

North Korea

North Korean children attend kindergarten from 4 to 6. Kindergartens have two sections; low class and high class high class is compulsory.

South Korea

In South Korea, children normally attend kindergarten between the ages of three or four and six or seven in the Western age system. (Korean ages are calculated differently from Western ages: one is considered one year old from birth. Additionally, one's age increases by one year on January 1 regardless of when their birthday is. Hence in Korea, kindergarten children are called five-, six- and seven-year-olds). The school year begins in March. It is followed by primary school. Normally the kindergartens are graded on a three-tier basis.

Korean kindergartens are private schools, and monthly costs vary. Korean parents often send their children to English kindergartens to give them a head start in English. Such specialized kindergartens can be mostly taught in Korean with some English lessons, mostly taught in English with some Korean lessons, or completely taught in English. Almost all middle-class parents send their children to kindergarten.

Kindergarten programs in South Korea attempt to incorporate much academic instruction alongside more playful activities. Korean kindergartners learn to read, write (often in English as well as Korean) and do simple arithmetic. Classes are conducted in a traditional classroom setting, with the children focused on the teacher and one lesson or activity at a time. The goal of the teacher is to overcome weak points in each child's knowledge or skills.

Because the education system in Korea is very competitive, kindergartens are becoming more intensely academic. Children are pushed to read and write at a very young age. They also become accustomed to regular and considerable amounts of homework. Very young children may also attend other specialized afternoon schools, taking lessons in art, piano or violin, taekwondo, ballet, soccer or mathematics.

Kuwait

In Kuwait, Kuwaiti children may go to free government kindergartens for two years (KG1 and KG2) between the ages of four and five.

Luxembourg

In Luxembourg, kindergarten is called  (literally "Playschool", plural ).

Malaysia

Most kindergartens are available to children of ages five and six (and some are available to children as young as four). For children up to the age of three (or four), there are preschool playgroups. There are no fixed rules for when a child needs to go to a kindergarten, but the majority do at 5 years of age. The child will usually attend kindergarten for two years, before proceeding to primary school at age 7.

Mexico

The kindergarten system in Mexico was developed by professor Rosaura Zapata, who received the country's highest honor for her contribution. It consists of three years of preschool education, which are mandatory before elementary school. Previous nursery is optional and may be offered in either private schools or public schools.

At private schools,  usually consist of three grades, and a fourth may be added for nursery. The fourth one is called ; it comes prior to the other three years and is not obligatory. While the first grade is a playgroup, the other two are classroom education.

In 2002, the Congress of the Union approved the Law of Obligatory Pre-schooling, which made preschool education for three to six-year-olds obligatory, and placed it under the auspices of the federal and state ministries of education.

Mongolia

As of September 2013, there are approximately 152 kindergartens registered in the country. From those 152 kindergartens, 142 are state-owned. Children begin kindergarten at the age of 2 and finish it by 5. The education system before kindergarten in Mongolia is called , which accepts children between 0 and 2 years of age.

Morocco

State-run, free  schools are available throughout the kingdom, welcoming children aged 2 to 5 (although in many places, children under 3 may not be granted a place). It is not compulsory, yet almost 80% of children aged 3 to 5 attend. It is regulated by the Moroccan Department of Education.

Nepal

In Nepal, kindergartens are run as private institutions, with their lessons conducted in English. The kindergarten education in Nepal is most similar to that of Hong Kong and India. Children start attending kindergarten from the age of 2 until they are at least 5 years old.

The kindergartens in Nepal have the following grades:
 Nursery/playgroup: 2- to 3-year-olds
 Lower Kindergarten: 3- to 4-year-olds
 Upper Kindergarten: 4- to 5-year-olds

Netherlands

From the mid-19th century to the mid-20th century the term  was also common, after Friedrich Fröbel. However, this term gradually faded in use as the verb  gained a slightly derogatory meaning in everyday language. Until 1985, it used to be a separate non-compulsory form of education (for children aged 4–6 years), after which children (aged 6–12 years) attended primary school. After 1985, both forms were integrated into one, called  (Dutch for primary education). For children under 4, the country offers private, subsidized day care, which are non-compulsory but nevertheless very popular.

New Zealand

In New Zealand, kindergarten can refer to education in the 2 years preceding primary school, from age 3 to 4. Primary Education starts at age 5.

North Macedonia

Norway

In Norway,  (children's garden) is the term equivalent to kindergarten, used for children in the ages between 10 months and 6 years. The first  were founded in Norway in the late 19th century. Although they have existed for 120 years, they are not considered part of the education system. They are both publicly and privately owned and operated. Children younger than three are often kept separate from the older children, since the youngest are only expected to play, rest and eat. All the children spend time outdoors every day. Many  let the children sleep outdoors too. There is also an institution called  (children's park), which does not need to have certified staff.

Peru

In Peru, the term  refers to the schooling children attend from 3 to 6 years of age. It is followed by primary school classes, which last for six years. Some families choose to send their children to primary school at the age of 6. In 1902 the teacher Elvira García y García organized the first kindergarten for children 2 to 8 years old, Fanning annex to the Lyceum for ladies. Her studies and concern for children led her to spread, through conferences and numerous documents, the importance of protecting children early and to respond to the formation of a personality based on justice and understanding, as well as the use of Fröbel's and Montessori's methods and parental participation.

Philippines
Early childhood education in the Philippines is mandatory, and is classified into:
 Center-based programs, such as the Barangay day care service, public and private preschools, kindergarten or school-based programs, community or church-based early childhood education programs initiated by non-government organizations or people's organizations, workplace-related child care and education programs, child-minding centers, health centers and stations; and
 Home-based programs, such as neighborhood-based playgroups, family day care programs, parent education and home visiting programs.

Early childhood education was strengthened through the creation of the Early Childhood Care and Development Act of 2000 (Republic Act No. 8980). In 2011, the Department of Education disseminated copies of the Kindergarten Education Act through Republic Act No. 10157 making it compulsory and mandatory in the entire nation. As a provision in this law, children under five years old are required to enroll in a kindergarten in any public elementary school in the country. This is part of the implementation of the K-12 system in the Basic Education Curriculum. Until the start of implementation of K-12 curriculum on June 6, 2011, upon making Kindergarten became mandatory, education officially started at the elementary level, and placing children into early childhood education through kindergarten was optional.

Poland

Romania

In Romania,  (literally "small garden") is the favored form of education for preschool children usually aged 3–6. The children are divided into three age groups: "little group" (age 3–4), "medium group" (age 4–5) and "big group" (age 5–6). In the last few years private kindergartens have become popular, supplementing the state preschool education system. Attending the last year of kindergarten is compulsory since 2020.

The "preparatory school year" is for children aged 6–7, and since it became compulsory in 2012, it usually takes place inside regular school classrooms and is considered "year 0" of elementary education, bridging the gap between kindergarten and years 1–4 of elementary school.

Russia

In the Russian Federation,  (literal translation of "children's garden") is a preschool educational institution for children, usually 3 to 6 years of age.

Singapore

Kindergartens in Singapore provide up to three years of preschool for children ages three to six. The three years are commonly called nursery, kindergarten 1 (K1) and kindergarten 2 (K2), respectively.

The People's Action Party, which has governed Singapore since 1957, runs over 370 kindergartens through its charitable arm, the PAP Community Foundation. The kindergartens are run by the private sector, including community foundations, religious bodies, and civic or business groups.

South Africa

Kindergartens (commonly known as creche) in South Africa provide preschool programs for children of all ages up to six. The one to three-year program, known as nursery, kindergarten 1 (K1), and kindergarten 2 (K2), prepares children for their first year in primary school education. Some kindergartens further divide nursery into N1 and N2.

Spain

Though non-mandatory, most children in Spain attend these courses.

In most parts of Spain  are specialized schools completely separate from regular schools.

Sudan

Kindergarten in Sudan is divided into private and public kindergarten. Preschool is compulsory in Sudan. Kindergarten age spans from 3–6 years. The curriculum covers Arabic, English, religion, mathematics and more.

Sweden

In Sweden, kindergarten activities were established in the 19th century, and have been widely expanded since the 1970s. The first Swedish kindergarten teachers were trained by Henriette Schrader-Breymann at the Pestalozzi-Fröbel Haus, which she founded in 1882.

Taiwan

While many public kindergartens and preschools exist in Taiwan, private kindergartens and preschools are also quite popular. Many private preschools offer accelerated courses in various subjects to compete with public preschools and capitalize on public demand for academic achievement. The curriculum at such preschools often encompasses subject material such as science, art, physical education and even mathematics classes. The majority of these schools are part of large school chains, which operate under franchise arrangements. In return for annual fees, the chain enterprises may supply advertising, curriculum, books, materials, training, and even staff for each individual school.

There has been a huge growth in the number of privately owned and operated English immersion preschools in Taiwan since 1999. These English immersion preschools generally employ native English-speaking teachers to teach the whole preschool curriculum in an English only environment. The legality of these types of schools has been called into question on many occasions, yet they continue to prosper. Some members of Taiwanese society have raised concerns as to whether local children should be placed in English immersion environments at such a young age, and have raised fears that the students' abilities in their mother language may suffer as a result. The debate continues, but at the present time, the market for English immersion preschools continues to grow.

Uganda

In Uganda, kindergarten is nursery or pre-primary and usually covers ages 3 to 5, the three classes called baby class, middle class and top class, respectively. Pupils graduating from top class then go on to enrol in P1 – the first year of primary school. Though non-mandatory, most children in Uganda today attend these classes. In most parts of Uganda, nursery schools are specialised schools completely separate from regular primary schools.

Ukraine

In 2010, a total of 56% of children aged one to six years old had the opportunity to attend preschool education, the Education and Science Ministry of Ukraine reported in August 2010. Many preschools and kindergartens were closed previously in light of economic and demographic considerations.

United Kingdom

The term kindergarten is rarely used in the UK to describe modern preschool education or the first years of compulsory primary school education. Preschools are usually known as creche, nursery schools or playgroups, while the first year of schooling is known as Reception in England and Wales and Primary One in Scotland and Northern Ireland (though different terms may be used in the small minority of UK schools which teach primarily through the medium of a language other than English). Nursery forms part of the Foundation Stage of education. In the 1980s, England and Wales officially adopted the Northern Irish system whereby children start school either in the term or year in which they will become five depending on the policy of the local education authority. In England, schooling is not compulsory until a child's fifth birthday but in practise most children join school in the Reception year the September before their fifth birthday.

However, the word "kindergarten" is used for more specialist organisations such as forest kindergartens and is sometimes used in the naming of private nurseries that provide full-day child care for working parents. Historically the word was used during the nineteenth century when activists like Adelaide Manning were introducing educators to the work of Friedrich Fröbel.

In the UK, parents have the option of nursery for their children at the ages of three or four years, before compulsory education begins. Before that, less structured childcare is available privately. The details vary between England, Northern Ireland, Scotland and Wales.

Some nurseries are attached to state infant or primary schools, but many are provided by the private sector. The Scottish government provides funding so that all children from the age of three until they start compulsory school can attend five sessions per week of two and a half hours each, either in state-run or private nurseries. Working parents can also receive from their employers childcare worth £55 per week free of income tax, which is typically enough to pay for one or two days per week.

England

Every child in England at the first school term after their third birthday is  entitled to 15 hours per week free childcare funding. Pre-schools in England follow the Early Learning Goals, set by the Early Years Foundation Stage, for education produced by the Department for Education, which carries on into their first year of school at the age of four. This year of school is usually called Reception. The Early Learning Goals cover the main areas of education without being subject driven. These areas include:

The three prime areas:

 communication and language
 physical development
 personal, social and emotional development

The four specific areas:

 literacy
 mathematics
 understanding the world
 expressive arts and design

Pupils attend nursery school for four or five terms. It is also common practice for many children to attend nursery much earlier than this. Many nurseries have the facilities to take on babies, using the 'Early Years Foundation Stage' framework as a guide to give each child the best possible start to becoming a competent learner and skilful communicator. Nurseries and playgroups are inspected and regulated by Her Majesty's Inspectors (Office for Standards in Education).

Scotland

The Scottish government defines its requirements for nursery schools in the Early Years Framework and the Curriculum for Excellence. Each school interprets these with more or less independence (depending on their management structure) but must satisfy the Care Inspectorate in order to retain their licence to operate. The curriculum aims to develop:
 confident individuals
 effective contributors
 responsible citizens
 successful learners

United States

In the United States, kindergarten is usually part of the K–12 educational system. In most schools, children begin kindergarten at age five for one year. Forty-three of the fifty states (the exceptions being Alaska, Idaho, Minnesota, Michigan, New Hampshire, New York, and Pennsylvania) require school districts to offer a kindergarten year. Students develop skills such as numeracy, literacy, and a greater awareness of the world around them geographically, scientifically, socially, and culturally.

See also
 Forest kindergarten
 Head Start Program
 Montessori education
 Pre-math skills
 Reggio Emilia approach
 Universal preschool
 Waldorf education

Notes

References

Further reading
The following reading list relates specifically to kindergarten in North America, where it is the first year of formal schooling and not part of the preschool system as it is in the rest of the world:
 
 
 
 Gullo, D. F. (1990). "The changing family context: Implications for the development of all-day kindergarten." Young Children, 45(4), 35–39. EJ 409 110.
 Housden, T., & Kam, R. (1992). "Full-day kindergarten: A summary of the research." Carmichael, CA: San Juan Unified School District. ED 345 868.
 Karweit, N. (1992). "The kindergarten experience." Educational Leadership, 49(6), 82–86. EJ 441 182.
 Koopmans, M. (1991). "A study of longitudal effects of all-day kindergarten attendance on achievement." Newark, NJ: Newark Board of Education. ED 336 494..
 Morrow, L. M., Strickland, D. S., & Woo, D. G.(1998). "Literacy instruction in half- and whole-day kindergarten." Newark, DE: International Reading Association. ED 436 756.
 Olsen, D., & Zigler, E.(1989). "An assessment of the all-day kindergarten movement." Early Childhood Research Quarterly, 4(2), 167–186. EJ 394 085.
 Puleo, V. T.(1988). "A review and critique of research on full-day kindergarten." Elementary School Journal, 88(4), 427–439. EJ 367 934.
 Towers, J. M. (1991). "Attitudes toward the all-day, everyday kindergarten." Children Today, 20(1), 25–28. EJ 431 720.
 West, J., Denton, K., & Germino-Hausken, E.(2000). "America's Kindergartners" Washington, DC: National Center for Educational Statistics
 McGill-Franzen, A. (2006). "Kindergarten literacy: Matching assessment and instruction in kindergarten." New York: Scholastic.
 WestEd (2005). "Full-Day Kindergarten: Expanding Learning Opportunities." San Francisco: WestEd.

External links

 Sources for kindergarten teachers in the US
 Friedrich Fröbel timeline
 Recent Research on All-Day Kindergarten in the US
 Kindersite Project – Researching into the use of technology within Kindergartens with Kindergarten-appropriate Internet content
 Watch the 1962 documentary Kindergarten
 

 
Early childhood education
Educational years
Educational stages
School types